James McDonald Vicary (April 30, 1915 – November 7, 1977) was a market researcher who pioneered the concept of subliminal advertising with an experiment in 1957, later determined to have been fraudulent. Vicary was unable to ever reproduce the results of his experiments.

Vicary finally admitted that his subliminal "experiment" had been concocted as a gimmick to attract customers to his failing marketing business.

Biography
Born in Detroit, and trained at the University of Michigan (A.B 1940), he pioneered the use of eye-blink analysis to obtain clues about subjects' levels of emotional tension when exposed to various stimuli. He also studied the phenomena of impulse buying and word association.

He was also known to have a childhood fascination with snakes. He was called Detroit's youngest snake charmer by The Detroit News.

Vicary became famous for perpetrating a fraudulent subliminal advertising study in 1957. In it, he claimed that an experiment in which moviegoers were repeatedly shown 1/3000-second advertisements for Coca-Cola and popcorn significantly increased product sales. Based on his claims the CIA produced a report "The operational potential of subliminal perception"  in 1958 that led to subliminal cuts being banned in the US. It suggested that "Certain individuals can at certain times and under certain circumstances be influenced to act abnormally without awareness of the influence".  When challenged later to replicate the study, Vicary failed to produce significant results. He provided no explanations for his results or any other details about his study to the public, claiming that it was part of a confidential patent. When Stuart Rogers interviewed the theater that supposedly conducted this experiment, the manager declared that no such test was ever done (Rogers 1992)

In a television interview with Fred Danzig in 1962 for Advertising Age, Vicary admitted that the original study was "a gimmick" and that the amount of data was "too small to be meaningful". He shied away from media attention after the disclosure. His papers are held by the Thomas J. Dodd Research Center at the University of Connecticut in Storrs. Numerous commentaries have appeared on this affair since 1957.

Popcorn experiment

One of the most commonly known examples of subliminal messaging is Vicary’s movie theater "experiment" in 1957, purportedly in Fort Lee, New Jersey. In his press release, he claimed that 45,699 people were exposed to subliminal projections telling them to "Eat Popcorn" and "Drink Coca-Cola", causing a 57.5 percent sales increase for popcorn and an 18.1 percent increase in Coca-Cola sales. Vicary provided no explanations for his results making it impossible to reproduce his results. Taken in context with evidence that no experiment even took place, Vicary’s results can be considered completely fraudulent. Vicary later retracted his claims in a television interview, but Vicary’s original claims spread rapidly and led to widespread acceptance of subliminal messaging, even today. (O’Barr 2005).

Publications
 "How Psychiatric Methods Can be Applied to Market Research", Printer's Ink, v. 235, no. 6, May 11, 1951, pp. 39–48.
 "Seasonal Psychology", Journal of Marketing, April 1956
 "The Circular Test of Bias in Personal Interview Surveys." Public Opinion Quarterly 19, no. 2, Summer 1955 215-218

See also
 Programming the Nation?

References

External links
 James M. Vicary Papers, Thomas J. Dodd Research Center, University of Connecticut

University of Michigan alumni
Mind control theorists
1915 births
1977 deaths